Mıgırdiç Civanyan (1848 – February 14, 1906) was an Ottoman Armenian painter.

Life 
Mıgırdiç Civanyan was born in the Beşiktaş district of Constantinople in 1848. In 1874, he met with famed Russian-Armenian painter Ivan Aivazovsky, whose work inspired Civanyan to incorporate much of the love for the sea into his own paintings. Already knowing Italian, Civanyan went to Italy in 1876 and remained there until 1879. Due to the Hamidian massacres of Armenians, Civanyan sought refuge in Odessa in the spring of 1894.

Style and Subject Matter
Mıgırdiç Civanyan is known for painting landscapes of Constantinople, especially that of the Bosphorus.

Gallery

References 

1848 births
1906 deaths
Armenian painters
Armenians from the Ottoman Empire
Artists from Istanbul
Ethnic Armenian painters
19th-century painters from the Ottoman Empire
Survivors of the Hamidian massacres